Roster may refer to:

 Roster (workplace), a list of employees and associated information for a given time period
 A list of players who are eligible to compete for a sports team

People
 Fred H. Roster (1944–2017), American sculptor
 Kevin Roster (1983–2019), American poker player and activist
 Roster McCabe, American rock band active during 2006–2014

Places
 Roster, Caithness, a township in the Scottish council area of Highland, United Kingdom
 Roster Road Halt railway station, in Highland, United Kingdom

Sports
 53-man roster, of the National Football League
 Developmental roster, of Major League Soccer
 Major League Baseball rosters
 Active roster (baseball)
 40-man roster (officially the "expanded roster")
 Minor League Baseball rosters

See also
 Rooster (disambiguation)
 Rostrum (ship)
 Rota (disambiguation)